is the ninth single by Japanese entertainer Akina Nakamori. Written by Masao Urino and Masayoshi Takanaka, the single was released on July 25, 1984 by Warner Pioneer through the Reprise label. It was also the second single from her sixth studio album Possibility.

Background 
The B-side "Kore kara Naturally" was featured in the compilation albums Complete Single Collection: First Ten Years and Mou Hitori no Akina.

Earlier live and TV performances of the song were known for Nakamori's black outfit and backwards bend.

Nakamori performed the song on the 35th Kōhaku Uta Gassen, making her second appearance on NHK's New Year's Eve special.

Nakamori has re-recorded "Jukkai (1984)" for the 2006 compilation Best Finger 25th Anniversary Selection. In 2010, she re-recorded the song for the pachinko machine .

Chart performance 
"Jukkai (1984)" sold 611,500 copies and became Nakamori's fifth No. 1 hit on Oricon's singles chart and was ranked No. 6 in Oricon's 1984 year-ending chart. It also hit No. 1 on The Best Ten's singles chart and landed on No. 8 on The Best Ten's 1984 year-ending chart.

Awards 
The song earned Nakamori her first Grand Prix at the Nippon Television Music Festival in 1984.

Track listing

Charts

Weekly charts

Year-end charts

Personnel 
 Akina Nakamori – vocals
 Masayoshi Takanaka – guitar, keyboard, synthesizer
 Ken Yajima – guitar
 Haruo Togashi – keyboard
 Joe Strings – string orchestra
 Eve – backing vocals

Cover versions 
 Jacky Cheung recorded a Cantonese version of the song titled "Guk Ngoi Yan" (局外人; "Foreigner") in his 1985 album Smile.
 Maika Misaki covered the song in her 2012 album 10 Carat.
 Romi Park covered the song in her 2013 compilation single "Twinkle Voice ~Goe no Okuri mono~".
 Noriko Shiina covered the song in her 2013 compilation single "King of Pops".
 Aural Vampire covered the song in their 2015 EP "Mimic Your Hairstyle".

References

External links 
 
 
 

1984 singles
1984 songs
Akina Nakamori songs
Japanese-language songs
Songs with lyrics by Masao Urino
Warner Music Japan singles
Reprise Records singles
Oricon Weekly number-one singles